William Style (1603–1679), was a legal writer. He attended Queen's and Brasenose colleges, Oxford. He was a barrister at Inner Temple in 1628. He compiled Regestum Practicale 1657, and other works.

Biography
Style was the eldest son of William Style of Langley, Beckenham, Kent (grandson of Sir Humphrey Style, Esquire of the Body to Henry VIII), by his second wife, Mary, daughter of Sir Robert Clarke, was born in 1603. He matriculated at Oxford, from Queen's College, on 12 June 1618, and resided for a time at Brasenose College, but left the university without a degree.

Style was admitted in November 1618 a student at the Inner Temple, where he was called to the bar in 1628. After the death without issue (1659) of his half-brother, Sir Humphrey Style, 1st Baronet, he resided on the ancestral estate of Langley. He died on 7 December 1679, and was buried in Langley church.

Works
Style translated from the Latin of John Michael Dilherr Contemplations, Sighes, and Groanes of a Christian, London, 1640, 12mo. He compiled:
 Regestum Practicale, or the Practical Register, consisting of Rules, Orders, and Observations concerning the Common Laws and the practice thereof,’ London, 1657, 8vo, 3rd edit. 1694.
 Narrationes Modernæ, or Modern Reports begun in the now Upper Bench Court at Westminster in the beginning of Hilary Term 21 Caroli, and continued to the end of Michaelmas Term, 1655, as well on the criminal as on the pleas side,’ London, 1658, fol.
He also edited, with additions, Glisson and Gulston's Common Law Epitomiz'd, London, 1679, 8vo. Style's Reports are the only published records of the decisions of Henry Rolle and Sir John Glynne.

Family
Style married Elizabeth, daughter of William Duleing of Rochester. They had two sons:
William, who died in his lifetime unmarried.
Humphrey, who died without male issue.

Notes

References
Attribution

 Endnotes:
Foster's Alumni Oxon.;
Hasted's Kent, i. 86;
Berry's County Geneal. (Kent);
Inner Temple Books;
Wood's Athenæ Oxon. (Bliss), iii. 470;
Wallace's Reporters;
Marvin's Legal Bibliography;
Brit. Mus. Cat.; 
Wotton's Baronetage, ii. 22;
Foster's Baronetage.

External links
 

1603 births
1679 deaths
People educated at Whitgift School
Lawyers from the Kingdom of England